"Songs for Justice" is a charity compilation released by the non-profit company Rock For Justice, that fight against global poverty and social injustice, on 7 May 2013.

Background 
The album started to be recorded by the artists in March–April 2012 until the beginning of 2013. The compilation was released with partnering of Speak Up Productions. The projects that benefited from the proceeds were Invisible Children, Inc., the Give a Damn? and The Hunger Project.

List of bands names 
List of the bands included in the compilation
 Brooke Waggoner
 Cara Salimando
 Funeral Party
 Generationals
 Hotel of the Laughing Tree
 Jhameel
 Kindred Fall 
 Les Sages
 Savior Adore
 The Dear Hunter
 The Narrative  
 Tapioca And The Flea
 Young Statues
 William Beckett

Track listing 
 "Here Comes the Night" - Generationals – 2:22  
 "Come Pick Me Up" - William Beckett, Cara Salimando – 5:05  
 "God Only Knows" - The Dear Hunter – 3:01  
 "Local Joke" - Savoir Adore – 3:04  
 "Ooh La La" - Funeral Party – 3:16  
 "Who Is It?" - Kindred Fall – 3:52  
 "Nowhere Man" - Tapioca & The Flea– 2:33  
 "My Girls" - Jhameel– 2:56  
 "The Love Cats" - Les Sages– 3:45  
 "Crazy Little Thing Called Love" - Hotel Of The Laughing Tree – 2:55  
 "Ashes & Fire" - Young Statues – 3:19  
 "Heart Of Gold" - The Narrative – 3:36  
 "Life On Mars?" - Brooke Waggoner – 3:25

Notes

External links 
 Bandcamp

Charity albums
Invisible Children